The men's junior  time trial of the 2022 UCI Road World Championships was a cycling event that took place on 20 September 2022 in Wollongong, Australia.

Final classification

References

Men's junior time trial
UCI Road World Championships – Men's junior time trial
2022 in men's road cycling